Marconi (possibly from Aymara marqu a medical plant, -ni a suffix, "the one with the marqu plant") is a mountain in the Urubamba mountain range in the Andes of Peru, about  high. It is located in the Cusco Region, La Convención Province, Huayopata District, and in the Urubamba Province, Ollantaytambo District. It lies north of the Urubamba River, west of Veronica.

References 

Mountains of Peru
Mountains of Cusco Region